Callionymus futuna, the Futuna deepwater dragonet, is a species of dragonet known only from the vicinity of Futuna Island.

References 

F
Fish described in 1998
Taxa named by Ronald Fricke